Richard Burbage (c. 1567 – 13 March 1619) was an English stage actor, widely considered to have been one of the most famous actors of the Globe Theatre and of his time. In addition to being a stage actor, he was also a theatre owner, entrepreneur, and painter. He was the younger brother of Cuthbert Burbage. They were both actors in drama. Burbage was a business associate and friend to William Shakespeare.

The son of James Burbage, a joiner who became a theatrical impresario and entrepreneur, also founded the first theatre. Burbage was a popular actor by his early 20s. He excelled in plays with the theme of tragedies. His early acting career is poorly documented. As many young actors of his time, he may have played the part of women in productions before taking any of the roles he is known for. As James Burbage acted for the Earl of Leicester's company, it has been suggested that his son, Richard, likely got his start with the company as well.

Burbage was described as being short and stout but was said to be an impressive figure, with numerous praises written of him in contemporary accounts. His power and scope as an actor is revealed in the sheer size of the roles he played. He was a great box office draw. Of the hundreds of plays and thousands of roles for actors that date from the 1580–1610 era, there are only twenty or so roles that are longer than 800 lines. Edward Alleyn was the first English actor to manage such roles, in Marlowe's Tamburlaine and The Jew of Malta; but the majority of these star roles, thirteen of the twenty, were acted by Burbage. He was said to be quite rich because he was earning income from being the primary housekeeper of two playhouses, a sharer in the King's Men, a lead actor and a painter.

Life 

Burbage was baptised at St Stephen in London on 7 July 1568. He was the second son of his parents, followed by three younger sisters; Alice, Joane, and Ellen. His father brought Burbage to the theatre and had the greatest influence on his career. Being the son of a builder and owner of the first successful permanent playhouse gave him starting in the theatre world. It is said that because he worked in the theatre with his father at such a young age, he learned the basics of working with colours and the techniques of painting, which helped him later in life.

After the death of their father in February 1597, Richard and his brother Cuthbert stepped in to rescue the family's interests in two London theatres and found themselves tied up in lawsuits. They kept the Blackfriars Theatre but leased it to lawyer and impresario Henry Evans, who used it for a troupe of child actors. The other, called simply ‘The Theatre’, was dismantled when they could not resolve terms for a new lease with Giles Allen, the landowner. Richard's father was influential in many parts of the acting industry at the time, as he owned one of the largest theatres at the time and directly worked with Shakespeare on his works.
The beams, posts, and other remnants of ‘The Theatre’ were moved to a new location on the south side of the Thames River and reassembled into a new playhouse called the Globe in 1599.

The Burbage brothers kept half the shares in the new theatre and gave the remainder to Shakespeare and other members of the Chamberlain's Men. Income from the Blackfriars lease helped fund the move to the Globe. In 1608 the brothers ended the Blackfriars lease and moved the company to the new theatre. Burbage was performing there on 29 June 1613, when it caught fire and burned down. During the winter months, when it was not practical to use the open-air Globe, they used the Blackfriars. It was much smaller and seated about 700 People.

The Burbage brothers maintained a close working and personal relationship throughout their lives; they were neighbours on Halliwell Street in Shoreditch, near the Theatre. 

Burbage married Winifred Turner on 2 October 1600 at St Mary's Rotherhithe. Burbage fathered at least eight children; after his death, his widow Winifred married another of the King's Men, Richard Robinson.

Career 

Richard Burbage was probably acting with the Admiral's Men in 1590, then joining Lord Strange's Men in 1592, and with the Earl of Pembroke's Men in 1593, but most famously he was the star of William Shakespeare's theatre company, the Lord Chamberlain's Men, which became the King's Men on the ascension of James I in 1603. He played the title role in the first performances of many of Shakespeare's plays, including Hamlet (In which Burbage was one of the likely influences for the main character and plot), Othello, Richard III, Romeo and Juliet, Macbeth, and King Lear. But he was in great demand and also appeared in the plays of many of the great contemporary writers, such as Ben Jonson (the title role in Volpone, and Subtle in The Alchemist), John Marston (The Malcontent), John Webster (The Duchess of Malfi) and Beaumont and Fletcher (The Maid's Tragedy). Burbage grew up in the life of the theatre as his father owned one of London's playhouses, leading some to cite his upbringing around the arts as the reason for his high level acting skills.

Unlike Alleyn or his fellow King's Man Shakespeare, Burbage never retired from the stage; he continued acting until his death, aged 52, in 1619. He was not such an astute businessman as either Alleyn or Shakespeare; at his death he was said to have left his widow "better than £300" in land—a respectable estate but far less than Alleyn's substantial wealth, and less than the net worth of Shakespeare at his death (also aged 52) in 1616.

Influence on Acting 
Burbage was the first ever actor to play Hamlet and continued to act until he died. Aside from Hamlet, he was also known for his role as Duke from Measure for Measure. Burbage's acting style allowed him to "easily slip into character", he was known to play characters believably – a difficult feat during his time: Because of theatre being a newer form of formal entertainment in Elizabethan England, actors could not rely on suspension of disbelief to aid their performance.

Despite this, Burbage was known as one of the best actors of his time, presumably from his reportedly convincing performance as Hamlet throughout the years. It is believed that his performances were so influential to acting during the time, that echoes of his performance as Hamlet are still seen in the way the character is performed today.

Death 
He remained a crowd favorite, even when younger actors emerged, for thirty-five years, and was an idol of his age. His last recorded performance was in 1610, but he acted with the King's Men until his death in 1619. His death caused such an outpouring of grief that it threatened to overshadow the official mourning for the death of Queen Anne ten days prior.

Burbage was buried in St Leonard's, Shoreditch, a church close to two theatres: "The Theatre" and "The Curtain Theatre". His gravestone was said to read "Exit Burbage." Although his gravestone is now lost, a memorial to him and his brothers was erected in a later century. An anonymous poet composed for him A Funerall Elegye on the Death of the famous Actor Richard Burbage who died on Saturday in Lent 13 March 1619, an excerpt of which reads:

Of the many elegies that followed his passing, perhaps the most poignant is the brief epitaph:

Portrayals 
Burbage was played by Lionel Belmore in the film Master Will Shakespeare (1936), by Paul Freeman in the miniseries Will Shakespeare (1978), Martin Clunes in the film Shakespeare in Love (1998), by Jalaal Hartley in the Doctor Who episode The Shakespeare Code (2007), by Steve Speirs in the BBC sitcom Upstart Crow (2016), by Mattias Inwood in the TNT drama Will (2017) and by Adam Colborne in the third episode of the miniseries Good Omens (2019), co-produced by the BBC and Amazon Video.

Speculation about Burbage

Portraiture 
It has sometimes been argued that the famous Chandos portrait of Shakespeare was painted by Burbage. His skills were in demand. Some believe that the anonymous oil painting used so often nowadays to show what Burbage looked like was a self-portrait. Dulwich College holds a painting of a female head in a roughly similar style that was generally regarded as his work until it was found out in 1987 that it was probably misattributed to him and that it is a work by a North Italian painter. The "Felton" portrait of Shakespeare is also attributed to Burbage, and also a portrait of a woman which is currently preserved at Dulwich College, in Southeast London.

Hamlet Theory 
There is a theory that William Shakespeare's Hamlet is written about Richard Burbage, not Shakespeare's son Hamnet. A discrepancy between the dates of the death of Hamnet, the death of James Burbage, and the initial drafts of Hamlet lead some scholars to believe that Burbage is the inspiration of the titular character.

Notes and references

Notes

References

Sources

Marino, James J. “Burbage’s Father’s Ghost.” English Literary Renaissance, vol. 44, no. 1, Blackwell Publishing Ltd, 2014, pp. 56–77, doi:10.1111/1475-6757.12021.

English male stage actors
1568 births
1619 deaths
People of the Elizabethan era
People associated with Shakespeare
English male Shakespearean actors
Theatre owners
16th-century English male actors
17th-century English male actors